Maïmouna Kane (13 March 1937 − 1 March 2019) was a Senegalese jurist and politician.

Biography 
Kane was born in Dakar. She was a judge at the Supreme Court of Senegal, and member of the government under president Abdou Diouf. On 15 March, 1978, she was appointed State Secretary to the Prime Minister responsible for the Status of Women. She was appointed alongside Caroline Faye Diop, making them the first women appointed ministers in Senegal. She was promoted to Minister of Social Development by Moustapha Niasse on 5 April 1983, serving until 2 January 1986.

Kane died in Paris on 1 March 2019.

References

1937 births
2019 deaths
People from Dakar
Senegalese judges
Senegalese politicians